The Halldis Moren Vesaas Prize is a Norwegian literary prize which is awarded annually to a Norwegian for lyric or other poetry, which through the quality and magnitude of the work has established a significant voice in Norwegian poetry. 

The prize was established by the publisher Olaf Norlis Bokhandel upon Halldis Moren Vesaas' death in 1995.  The jury consists of a manager from Norlis, the literary director from another publisher and the current head of the Norwegian Writers' Center. The prize has not been awarded since 2007.

Winners of the Halldis Moren Vesaas Prize

 2007 Eldrid Lunden
 2004 Morten Øen
 2003 Espen Stueland
 2002 Torgeir Schjerven
 2001 Haakon Dahlen
 2000 Øyvind Berg
 1999 Georg Johannesen
 1998 Torild Wardenær
 1997 Bjørn Aamodt
 1996 Rune Christiansen
 1995 Arvid Torgeir Lie

References and notes

Norwegian literary awards
Poetry awards
Awards established in 1995